Helen Cristina Santos Luz (born November 23, 1972 in Araçatuba, Brazil) is a retired Brazilian professional basketball player. A starting guard on the great Brazilian teams of the 1990s and early 2000s, she was world champion in the 1994 FIBA World Championship for Women and bronze medallist at the 2000 Summer Olympics. Luz also played for the Washington Mystics in the Women's National Basketball Association (WNBA) in 2001–2003, and in the Spanish Liga Femenina for Zaragoza (2003–2004), Barcelona (2004–2006), Rivas (2006–2007), Cadi La Seu (2007–2008), and Hondarribia-Irun (2008–2010). She finished her career in one final season with the Brazilian team Americana, in São Paulo State, announcing her retirement at the end of February 2011.

Since retiring, Helen has become a commentator on SporTV, opened (with her sisters) a social project for teaching basketball to children in Louveira, and begun a regular blog.   In addition, she told interviewers that she hoped to become a mother, and on November 21, 2012, she and her husband Octavio welcomed into the world their son Pedro Lafiaccola Luz.  Most recently she has become vice president of the Liga Basquete Feminino (the Women's Basketball League of Brazil), and has been invited to join the Commission for Women in Sport set up by the Brazilian Olympic Committee.

She is sister to three other basketballers, Silvia, Cínthia and Rafael.

Brazilian national team career
Helen played on the Brazilian women's national teams that competed in the Olympics in Barcelona in 1992 (7th place), Sydney in 2000 (bronze medal), and Athens in 2004 (4th place), and in the World Championships in Australia in 1994 (Gold medal), Germany in 1998 (4th place), China in 2002 (7th place), and Brazil in 2006 (4th place). Her teams were South American Champions in 1991, 1993, 1997, 1999, 2005, 2006 and 2010. She was MVP in the 2001 Copa América in Brazil and 2005 in Paraguay.

Helen retired from the national team after the 2006 World Championship games, but returned in 2009 to help lead the team to victory in the FIBA Americas Championship. In the four games of the tournament she led the Brazilian team in points per game (12.0, 10th in the tournament) and was second on the team in assists per game (3.6, 3rd in the tournament).

WNBA career
Helen signed as a free agent with the Washington Mystics prior to the start of their 2001 training camp.  She averaged 13.4 minutes per game over three seasons, usually coming off the bench as a 3-point specialist. She was a fan favorite for her enthusiasm and intelligent, unselfish play; the moment she stood up to approach the scorer's table, the MCI Center would resound with shouts of "Luz!" (A story in the Washington Post reported that she initially thought she was being booed, and wondered why.)  She finished her WNBA career with a quite respectable .377 3-point shooting percentage -- .500 in four playoff games.

Pro League career
Helen played in the Brazil Pro League from 1994 through 2002, with her clubs winning several championships.  In 2004, she played with Novosibirsk in the Russian Pro League.  From 2003 through 2010 she played in the Spanish Pro League, winning a championship with Barcelona in 2004–5 and Supercopa in 2005 before moving to Cadi in 2007 and then to Hondarribia-Irun in 2008.

External links
WNBA Player Profile
Irmãs Luz
Sportalents Sports Management Agency
Hondarribia-Irun team in Spanish Liga Femenina
“Mystics' Luz Plays Name Game; Brazilian Lets Court Work Talk as She Handles Language, Cultural Barriers”
Interview with Photos (in Portuguese)
Helen, Alessandra and outcast Iziane return for Brazil
Helen planeja encabeçar retorno de jogadoras brasileiras ao país
FIBA Americas Championship 2009
Helen de Volta Americana
Interview discussing retirement -- nice photos
Videotape of interview
Appreciation from Spanish Basketball Federation
Luuuuz Blog on Basketeria

1972 births
Living people
People from Araçatuba
Brazilian people of German descent
Basketball players at the 1992 Summer Olympics
Basketball players at the 1999 Pan American Games
Basketball players at the 2000 Summer Olympics
Basketball players at the 2004 Summer Olympics
Brazilian expatriate basketball people in Spain
Brazilian expatriate basketball people in the United States
Brazilian expatriates in Russia
Brazilian women's basketball players
Olympic basketball players of Brazil
Olympic bronze medalists for Brazil
Olympic medalists in basketball
Pan American Games competitors for Brazil
Point guards
Shooting guards
Washington Mystics players
Medalists at the 2000 Summer Olympics
Sportspeople from São Paulo (state)